Edward Clarence Uren (6 January 1900 – 3 July 1968) was an Australian rules footballer who played with Carlton in the Victorian Football League (VFL).

Notes

External links 
 
 Clarrie Uren's profile at Blueseum
 

1900 births
1968 deaths
Carlton Football Club players
Kalgoorlie Railways Football Club players
Australian rules footballers from Western Australia
People from Boulder, Western Australia